Thomas Catlow (24 October 1892 – 1976) was an English footballer who played for Swansea Town and Rochdale, as well as non-league football for other clubs.

References

1892 births
1976 deaths
Rochdale A.F.C. players
Darwen F.C. players
Trawden Forest F.C. players
Southend United F.C. players
Barry Town United F.C. players
Stockport County F.C. players
Mid Rhondda F.C. players
Swansea City A.F.C. players
English footballers
Footballers from Blackburn
Association footballers not categorized by position